Mangani Lal Mandal (born 1 July 1948) is an Indian politician from the Rashtriya Janata Dal party and a former Member of the Parliament of India representing Jhanjharpur constituency in the Lok Sabha.

Previously, he was a member of Bihar Legislative Council from 1986 to 2004. During this period, he was also a minister in the state cabinet. From 2004 to 2009, he was also a Member of Rajya Sabha.

He left Rashtriya Janta Dal and join Janta Dal (United) during parliyamentry election 2019.

References

External links
 Profile on Lok Sabha website
 IndiaToday Report
 Times Of India Report
 Patna High Court Judgement that disqualified him

Janata Dal (United) politicians
India MPs 2009–2014
Living people
Lok Sabha members from Bihar
People from Madhubani district
Indian politicians disqualified from office
Rajya Sabha members from Bihar
Rashtriya Janata Dal politicians
1948 births
Members of the Bihar Legislative Council
State cabinet ministers of Bihar
Candidates in the 2014 Indian general election